

Events

By month

January events 
  10 January – Regular through passenger service from Wuhan to Wanzhou over the complete new Yiwan Railway in China starts.

February events 
  19 February – First public passenger train operates throughout between Caernarfon and Porthmadog Harbour over the restored Welsh Highland Railway.
  28 February – Wabtec announces that it has acquired Brush Traction, the English-based locomotive builder and maintainer, for US$31 million.

March events 
  13 March – Kyushu Shinkansen opens between Hakata of Fukuoka and Shin-Yatsushiro, with Osaka and Kagoshima direct bullet train starting.

April events 
  March–April – Eurasian Land Bridge test run from Chongqing to Duisburg (DB) via Alashankou crossing, Kazakhstan, Russia, Belarus, and Poland, covering  in 16 days.
  19 April – Zaragoza tram starts its commercial operation.

May events 
  1 May – Veendam railway station opens in the Netherlands.
  1 May – Tide Light Rail begins service in Norfolk, Virginia.

June events 
  6 June – Munich–Augsburg railway is upgraded to four-track.
  16 June – An NSB Class 73 burns up after catching fire in a burning show shed at Hallingskeid Station on Norway's Bergen Line.
  20 June – A-Train commuter rail service begins in northern Texas.
  22 June – Shenzhen Metro's Line 5 opens.
  28 June – Phase 2 of Shenzhen Metro Line 2 connecting Window of the World Station to Xinxiu Station opens for trial runs.
  30 June – Beijing-Shanghai High-Speed Railway opens in China.

July events 
  23 July – Wenzhou train collision: At least 39 people are killed when a China Railway High-speed train collides in rear with a preceding stationary train halted by a lightning strike, throwing two coaches off a viaduct close to Wenzhou in Zhejiang province.

August events 
  7 August – West Valley and Mid-Jordan extensions of TRAX open in the Salt Lake City, Utah, area.
  15 August – The Gevingåsen Tunnel on Norway's Nordland Line opens.
  19 August – The first line of the Jerusalem Light Rail opens to passengers. It runs from Pisgat Ze'ev in the northeast, south along Road 60 to Jaffa Road (Rehov Yafo). From there, it runs along Jaffa Road westward to the Jerusalem Central Bus Station, and continues to the southwest, crossing the Chords Bridge designed by Santiago Calatrava, along Herzl Boulevard to Beit HaKerem and terminates near Mount Herzl.
  26 August – The Bærum Tunnel and section of track between Lysaker and Sandvika on Norway's Asker Line is taken into use.
  31 August – Opening of Docklands Light Railway extension from Canning Town to the new Stratford International station, taking over the North London Line infrastructure (which closed on 9 December 2006) and linking the Docklands area with domestic and international high-speed services on High Speed 1 and with the 2012 Olympic Games site.

September events 
  27 September – Brookhaven Rail Terminal opened on Long Island, New York, a 28-acre facility for bulk commodities

October events 
  8 October – The Circle MRT Line becomes fully operational.
  – Banihal-Qazigund railway tunnel (Pir Panjal Railway Tunnel) a part of its Udhampur – Srinagar – Baramulla rail link project, opened in October 2011, India's longest and Asia's second longest railway tunnel and reduced the distance between Quazigund and Banihal to only 11 km. The 10.96 km long railway tunnel, passes through the Pir Panjal Range of middle Himalayas in Jammu and Kashmir.

November events 
  7 November – A new  segment of the Vestfold Line with double track between Barkåker and Tønsberg, including the Jarlsberg Tunnel, is taken into use.
  8 November - The new 5000-Series rail cars (5001-5706), built by Bombardier Transportation of Plattsburgh, New York are placed in revenue service on the Chicago Transit Authority elevated-subway rail system. These new rail cars (the first since the 1992-94 built Morrison-Knudsen 3200-Series) represent the next generation of high-tech transport on the Chicago 'L'-Subway. They feature smooth stainless steel car bodies with fluted sidewalls, sculptured face ends, color-coded digital LED destination signs, ADA accessibility with longitudinal seating arrangements and two wheelchair locations. The 5000-Series cars are also equipped with AC traction motors.

December events 
  11 December – SNCF opens LGV Rhin-Rhône.
  11 December – Sassenheim railway station opens in the Netherlands.
  28 December – Hangzhou Metro opens in China.

Unknown date events 

  – The aging Hitachi trains in Melbourne are completely phased out.
  – China high-speed Rail faces with crisis after train crash. Several executions happen in governments, train speeds are reduced from 350 km/h to 300 km/h and from 250 km/h to 200 km/h. Expansion of high-speed corridors became uncertain, but will see the second boom in next few years.
  – JR East phases out 113 series.

Industry awards

Japan 
 Awards presented by the Japan Railfan Club
 2011 Blue Ribbon Award: Keisei Electric Railway AE series Skyliner EMU
 2011 Laurel Prize: Tokyo Metro 16000 series EMU

North America 
2011 E. H. Harriman Awards

Awards presented by Railway Age magazine
 2011 Railroader of the Year: Wick Moorman (NS)
 2011 Regional Railroad of the Year:
 2011 Short Line Railroad of the Year:

United Kingdom 
Train Operator of the Year
 2011: South West Trains

Deaths
 15 January – Francesco di Majo, designer of the Pendolino (born 1910).
 4 May – Richard Steinheimer, American railroad photographer, dies (b. 1929).
 10 July – William D. Middleton, well-known American rail-transport writer (b. 1928).
 29 July – Richard Marsh, Baron Marsh, chairman of British Rail 1971–1976, dies (b. 1928).
 20 October – Roger Tallon, designer of the TGV (born 1929).

References